Neon Noir is the debut studio album by former HIM frontman Ville Valo, released on 13 January 2023. The album debuted at number one on the Finnish albums chart and in the top five of the German albums chart.

Background 
Upon the conclusion of his previous project Ville Valo & Agents in August 2019, Valo began experimenting with recording new music in his home studio. With the onset of widespread lockdown measures in response to the COVID-19 pandemic in March 2020, Valo self-released a three-track EP entitled Gothica Fennica, Vol. 1 under the moniker VV to gauge interest. The EP was fully produced, engineered, and performed by Valo with mixing by longtime HIM collaborator Tim Palmer. Through 2021, Valo continued recording material and negotiating distribution deals for the impending release of a full-length album, ultimately settling on his own Heartagram Records imprint publishing while distribution is handled by Universal and its subsidiary, legendary Finnish heavy metal record label Spinefarm.

The album title, Neon Noir, carries over HIM's convention of combining two contradictory ideas in album titles. Neon referring to bright lighting and "noir" being the French word for black. The title is also a pun nodding to neo-noir films, exemplified by melodramatic storytelling and visually contrasting darkness and light.

On 14 September 2022, Valo confirmed the tracklist and release date of Neon Noir. Pre-orders with limited edition bundles were made available the same date.

Artwork and packaging 
The cover photograph for the album was shot by Joonas Brandt using a Mamiya RZ67 black and white camera on Kodak Tri-X 400 film. The album will be released in limited edition vinyl, CD, and cassette formats, with packaging designed by Ville Valo and graphic designer Rami Mursula, with whom Valo has been working since HIM's 2013 release Tears on Tape.

Reception 

Reviewing the album for Tone Deaf, Conor Lochrie wrote that "Instrumentally the album sounds most like the latter of HIM's discography, taking from albums like Screamworks: Love in Theory and Practice and Tears on Tape", and concluding that "Neon Noir is a glowing hope in a murky world".

Track listing

Personnel 
Written, produced, engineered, and performed by Ville Valo (Helsinki)
Co-produced and Mixed by Tim Palmer at Studio 62 (Austin, Texas)
Mastered by Justin Shturtz at Sterling Sound (New York City)
Art by Ville Valo with Rami Mursula
Published by Heartagram

Charts

References 

2023 debut albums
Albums produced by Tim Palmer